388th may refer to:

388th Electronic Combat Squadron, inactive United States Air Force unit
388th Fighter Squadron or 132nd Fighter Wing (132d W), United States Air Force unit assigned to the Iowa Air National Guard, located at Des Moines International Airport, Iowa
388th Fighter Wing, 4th Fighter Squadron (4 FS), conducts flying operations and equipment maintenance to maintain combat readiness of an 18-aircraft F-16C LANTIRN squadron
388th Operations Group, the flying component of the 388th Fighter Wing, assigned to the Air Combat Command Twelfth Air Force

See also
388 (number)
388, the year 388 (CCCLXXXVIII) of the Julian calendar
388 BC